This article is a list of episodes from the television show Space Battleship Yamato III in order by production number.

Episodes

References

III